Samuel Kirnon (born 25 December 1962) was an English cricketer. He was a right-handed batsman and right-arm medium-fast bowler who played for Glamorgan. He was born in Preston.

Kirnon, who spent his childhood in Montserrat, and later joined the British Army, made a single first-class appearance on the basis of good performances for German cricket club Dortmund.

Kirnon made a single first-class appearance for the team, during the 1992 season, against Oxford University. He did not bat in the match, but bowled 14 overs, taking one wicket.

Kirnon made two List A appearances for the team between 1991 and 1992, scoring a single run.

External links
Sam Kirnon at CricketArchive 

1962 births
Living people
English cricketers
Glamorgan cricketers